Nyctemera distincta is a moth of the family Erebidae first described by Francis Walker in 1854. It is found on Java in Indonesia.

References

Nyctemerina
Moths described in 1854